Hassan Ali Hallak (born 1946) is a Lebanese historian, academic, and  writer, known mostly for his work about the Origins of the Beiruti families, and Beirut's history during the Ottoman era.

Biography 
Hallak was born in Beirut in 1946. He obtained his PhD in history from the University of Alexandria in 1981, then he went back to Beirut where he taught Islamic and Arab history at the Lebanese University, and later at Beirut Arab University.

Hallak is noted for being the first person to extract, verify and publish the records of the Islamic court of Beirut, upon which many of his published books and studies are based. Several of these documents helped in rewriting certain aspects of Beiruti and Lebanese history during the Ottoman era. He was also the first person to extract, verify and publish the records and documents of the Beirut Municipality. His collection includes about one hundred thousand unpublished documents.

In 2007, he received the Alexandria University Appreciation Award. He was also awarded the Arab Historian Certificate from the Union of Arab Historians (1993), the Medal of Appreciation from the Moroccan University Graduates Association (1999), the Rafic Hariri Medal (2008), a certificate of appreciation from the Union of Arab Historians (1993), among others. He was also a candidate to receive the King Faisal Prize for Islamic Studies in 1995 CE (1415 AH).

Works 
He wrote more than 60 books about Islamic, Arab, Ottoman, Lebanese, and Beiruti histories; many of which were translated into English, French, German, and Turkish.

His most notable work is the huge multi-volume Encyclopedia of the Beiruti families, The Attitude of the Ottoman Empire towards the Zionist Movement 1897-1909, Role of the Jews and International Powers in dethroning Sultan Abdulhamid II 1908-1909, and Memoirs of Selim Ali Salam.

References

1946 births
20th-century Lebanese historians
21st-century Lebanese historians
Alexandria University alumni
Academic staff of Beirut Arab University
Living people
Historians of Islam